Rohit Chand Thakuri (born 1 March 1992) is a Nepalese professional footballer who plays as a midfielder for Liga 1 club Persik Kediri and the Nepal national team. During his teenage years, Chand was heavily linked to clubs such as Arsenal, Tottenham, and Lille. Chand was awarded The Best Player of The Year in Liga 1 2018 (the highest level of Indonesia football competition) as well as becoming champion with Persija Jakarta.

Early years
Rohit Chand Thakuri was born in Surkhet, Nepal. He started playing football at the age of eight with his brother Rabin Chand Thakuri, who is also a semi-professional footballer, at the age of 13 he was selected for ANFA academy. Chand's tour in Iran with the U-16 national team in 2008 was the turning point of his career. At the age of 16, Chand was called up to the senior national team even though he hadn't played any games both at club and U-19 team's level. This allowed Chand to propel his professional football career quickly in Nepal.

Club career

Machhindra Football Club
Chand's first professional club in Nepal's top flight was Machhindra Football Club. Chand's play had brought him four Man of the Match awards during the league campaign and his play at the back had been one of the highlights of Machhindra's season. The young stopper has led a defense that doesn't leak too many goals, but he also can be a threat moving up the pitch. Chand had shown his leadership qualities and captained Machhindra.  He was awarded best defender of the year award for his spectacular play during the 2067B.S.(2010–11) league season. Machhindra FC also reached the semifinals of the British Gurkha Cup that season.

HAL SC
On 2 January 2012 it was reported that Chand had signed a 6-month contract with the club after trying his luck in Europe. In April, Chand scored a hat-trick in I-League match but despite his efforts his team went on to lose the match. And his efforts were not enough to prevent HAL from relegation in the I-League. His contract at HAL SC expired in 2012 after they were relegated from the top tier of I-League.

PSPS Pekanbaru
Rohit Chand gave a trial at Indonesia Liga Side Arema where he was able to give an average performance, although he was not selected by the team. Later he was signed by another Indonesian side PSPS Pekanbaru on a 10 months.

Persija Jakarta
In May 2013 he signed a 5-month contract with the Indonesian side Persija Jakarta in the Indonesia Super League. He was then nominated for the Young player of the year award for the same season in the Indonesian league. After his best performance. He has signed new two year contract with club and Rohit will be staying in Persija Jakarta till end of 2022.

FC Vestsjaelland
Rohit has trained with the club for more than one and half months until 25 December 2013. He was offered with 6 months contract for reserved team as like Indian Goalkeeper Subrata Paul. Rohit's Manager Rabindra Chand denied the offer and placed Rohit to ISL club.

T-Team
Rohit signed a year deal with Malaysian Outfit T-Team FC in January 2016.

Return to Persija Jakarta
After a brief spell for local Nepalese club Manang Marshyangdi, it was announced that Chand had returned to Indonesian club, Persija Jakarta.

Persik Kediri
After end contract with Persija Jakarta. he sign with another Indonesian club, Persik Kediri.

International career
Chand is the youngest players to play the full senior level tournament for Nepal, making his debut on 23 March 2009 (16 years 22 days) against Palestine in the AFC which was later broke by Bimal Gharti Magar. He also made many appearances in different age groups (U-17 and U-19 age). Rohit was named the vice-captain of the national team in 2015.

Honours

Club
 Persija Jakarta
Liga 1
Champions (1): 2018

Indonesia President's Cup
Champions (1): 2018
Menpora Cup
Champions (1): 2021

International

 Nepal
Three Nations Cup
  Champions (1): 2021
 SAFF Championship runner up: 2021

Individual
Special Award of the Year Pulsar NSJF Sports Award (Nepal)': 2019Liga 1 Most Valuable Player: 2018Liga 1 Best Eleven: 2018Martyr's Memorial A-Division League Best Defender: 2010Three Nations Cup: Best Player: 2021
 Menpora Cup Best Eleven: 2021'

Personal life
Chand hails from Birendra Nagar in Surkhet District. His idol is Paolo Maldini. Aside from football Chand is also an avid reader and enjoys novels, and also loves pets having a dog named Roger.

References

External links
Official Website

1992 births
Living people
People from Surkhet District
Nepalese footballers
Nepal international footballers
Nepal youth international footballers
Nepalese expatriate footballers
Bangalore Super Division players
Liga 1 (Indonesia) players
Malaysia Super League players
Expatriate footballers in India
Expatriate footballers in Indonesia
Expatriate footballers in Malaysia
Nepalese expatriate sportspeople in India
Expatriate sportspeople in Indonesia
Nepalese expatriate sportspeople in Malaysia
Machhindra F.C. players
Hindustan Aeronautics Limited S.C. players
PSPS Pekanbaru players
PSPS Riau players
Persija Jakarta players
Terengganu F.C. II players
Manang Marshyangdi Club players
Persik Kediri players
Footballers at the 2014 Asian Games
Association football fullbacks
Association football utility players
Footballers at the 2018 Asian Games
Asian Games competitors for Nepal